Rouez, also called Rouez-en-Champagne, is a commune in the Sarthe department in the region of Pays de la Loire in north-western France.

Geography
The village lies in the middle of the commune, on the left bank of the Merdereau, a left tributary of the Vègre, which flows southeastward through the commune.

See also
Communes of the Sarthe department

References

Communes of Sarthe